Abdul Ghafoor Khan Durrani (1910  2000) was a Pakistani politician. He was born in Quetta, Balochistan, British India in 1910.

Political career

He brought Shahzada Rehmatullah Khan Saddozai, chief of the Sadozai Durrani tribe of Balochistan, into the Muslim League for an important role in the Pakistan Independence movement. In November 1959 all the Chairmen of Union Committees within Quetta city became members of the Quetta Municipal Committee and then Khan Abdul Ghafoor Khan Durrani was elected its 1st Vice Chairman, whereas the Quetta Political Agent remained as its chairman.

He was also the General Secretary of Anjuman e Islamia Quetta.

See also 
 Jinnah

References

External links 
 https://web.archive.org/web/20080726190710/http://www.app.com.pk/en/pdf/balochistan.pdf

1910 births
2000 deaths
Pakistan Movement activists
Pakistani politicians
Pashtun people
People from Quetta